Robert Browning Windsor (born January 15, 1997) is an American football defensive tackle for the Vegas Vipers of the XFL. He played college football at Penn State and professionally for the Indianapolis Colts of the National Football League (NFL).

College career
After playing at Fond du Lac High School in Fond du Lac, Wisconsin, Windsor chose Penn State. He committed to Penn State on January 25, 2015, choosing Penn State over other Big Ten schools Wisconsin, Illinois, Minnesota, Maryland and Purdue, who all extended scholarship offers.

During his junior season, Windsor recorded 7.5 sacks. He missed the 2020 Citrus Bowl due to an unspecified violation of team rules.

Prior to his senior season, Windsor was named to the Outland Trophy watchlist. After taking stock of what he deemed a lackluster season part of the way through, Windsor recorded 2.5 sacks against Iowa, with teammates praising him for his work ethic and sacrifices. After his senior season, Windsor was named second-team All-Big Ten Conference.

He also took part in the 2020 Senior Bowl and 2020 NFL Combine.

Professional career

Indianapolis Colts
Windsor was drafted in the sixth round (193rd overall) by the Indianapolis Colts in the 2020 NFL Draft. He was waived on September 5, 2020, and signed to the practice squad the next day. He was elevated to the active roster on November 21 and 28 for the team's weeks 11 and 12 games against the Green Bay Packers and Tennessee Titans, and reverted to the practice squad after each game. He was placed on the practice squad/COVID-19 list by the team on December 24, 2020, and restored to the practice squad on December 29. On January 10, 2021, Windsor signed a reserve/futures contract with the Colts.

On July 25, 2021, Windsor was placed on injured reserve.

On April 7, 2022, Windsor officially retired from the National Football League, citing injuries and delays in his rehabilitation as the main reason.

Vegas Vipers
Windsor was drafted by the Vegas Vipers in the 2023 XFL Draft.

Personal life
Windsor previously graduated from Penn State with a degree in telecommunications and started a media studies degree in his redshirt senior year.

References

External links
Penn State Nittany Lions football bio

1997 births
Living people
Players of American football from Wisconsin
Sportspeople from Green Bay, Wisconsin
American football defensive tackles
Penn State Nittany Lions football players
Indianapolis Colts players
Vegas Vipers players